Ricardo Herrera (born 7 November 1967) is a Mexican former professional tennis player.

Herrera, who played college tennis for San Diego State University, represented Mexico at the 1995 Pan American Games in Mar del Plata, Argentina. He won a bronze medal in the men's doubles event, partnering Mario Pacheco.

His only ATP Tour main draw appearance came in the doubles at the 1995 Mexican Open.

References

External links
 
 

1967 births
Living people
Mexican male tennis players
Pan American Games medalists in tennis
Pan American Games bronze medalists for Mexico
Tennis players at the 1995 Pan American Games
San Diego State Aztecs men's tennis players
Medalists at the 1995 Pan American Games
20th-century Mexican people